Sistotremastrum is a genus of crust fungi in the Hydnodontaceae family. The genus has a widespread distribution, and contains four species. Sistotremastrum was defined by Swedish mycologist John Eriksson in 1958.

References

Trechisporales
Trechisporales genera